Daniela Berček (Serbian Cyrillic: Даниела Берчек, born 7 July 1984) is a Serbian former professional tennis player.

She won two doubles titles on the ITF Circuit in her career. On 25 August 2003, she reached her best singles ranking of world No. 543. On 29 September 2003, she peaked at No. 363 in the WTA doubles rankings.

Playing for FR Yugoslavia in the Fed Cup, Berček has a win–loss record of 1–1.

Novi Sad-born Berček retired from active playing in 2007 after representing Serbia at the 2007 Summer Universiade in Bangkok.

ITF Circuit finals

Doubles: 5 (2 titles, 3 runner-ups)

Fed Cup participation

Doubles

References

External links
 
 
 

1984 births
Living people
Sportspeople from Novi Sad
Serbian female tennis players
Serbia and Montenegro female tennis players
Yugoslav female tennis players